The Birmingham Railway Carriage and Wagon Company (BRC&W) was a railway locomotive and carriage builder, founded in Birmingham, England and, for most of its existence, located at nearby Smethwick, with the factory divided by the boundary between the two places. The company was established in 1854.

Production

BRC&W made not only carriages and wagons, but a range of vehicles, from aeroplanes and military gliders to buses, trolleybuses and tanks. Nevertheless, it is as a builder of railway rolling stock that the company is best remembered, exporting to most parts of the new and old worlds. It supplied vehicles to all four of the pre-nationalisation "big four" railway companies (LMS, SR, LNER and GWR), British Rail, Pullman (some of which are still in use) and Wagons-Lits, plus overseas railways with diverse requirement including Egypt, India, Iraq, Malaya, Mandate Palestine, South Africa and Nigeria. The company even built, in 1910, Argentina's presidential coach, which still survives, and once carried Eva Perón.  Before World War II, the company had built steam-, petrol- and diesel-powered railcars for overseas customers, not to mention bus bodies for Midland Red, and afterwards developed more motive power products, including BR's Class 26, Class 33 (both diesel) and Class 81 (electric) locomotives. Examples of all three types are preserved.

Wartime production
The company built hospital trains during the Second Boer War. Handley Page Type O bombers and Airco DH.10 Amienss were built in World War I.

During World War 2, the company had a major impact on tank production as one of the many companies building the A10 Cruiser tank, Valentine tank, Churchill tank, Cromwell tank and Challenger tank). They led the design and production of the Cromwell tank in liaison with Rolls-Royce and Rover on the Meteor engine.

The company also built Hamilcar gliders in 1939-1945.

Locomotives
Some of the locomotives and multiple units built by the company are listed below:

Diesel Locomotives
 14 Commonwealth Railways NSU class in 1954. Works number DEL1-14
 5 similar locos for Sierra Leone Development Corporation in 1954 (works number DEL 15-19), plus one more in 1962. (work number DEL259)
 12 Córas Iompair Éireann 101 class in 1956–1957 (works numbers DEL20-31)
 13 locos for Ghana Railway And Harbours Administration (works numbers DEL32-44)
 47 British Rail Class 26 in 1958–1959 (works numbers DEL45-91)
 98 British Rail Class 33 in 1960–1962 (works numbers DEL92-189)
 69 British Rail Class 27 in 1961–1962 (works numbers DEL190-258)
 1 British Rail D0260 Lion in 1962 (works number DEL260)

Electric Locomotives
British Rail Class 81

Diesel Multiple Units

British Rail Class 104
British Rail Class 110 (with Drewry Car Co.)
British Rail Class 118
Egypt State Railways 3 & 5 Car Railcars

Electric Multiple Units
London Underground 1923 Tube Stock
London Underground 1938 Tube Stock
London Underground 1956 Tube Stock
London Underground 1962 Tube Stock The order was transferred to Metro-Cammell owing to the financial problems at BRCW.
London Underground CO/CP Stock
London Underground R47 Stock
London Underground T Stock
LMS/BR Wirral & Mersey Class 503

Closure
In the years before 1963, the company had built an extensive number of locomotives, diesel multiple unit trains, and Underground cars, but it then became apparent that fewer rolling stock orders were to be expected, and the company restructured itself as an industrial landlord and financing business. The self-funded main line locomotive prototype Lion was a particular disappointment. Powered by a Sulzer  diesel engine, it was pitted against another self-funded prototype, Falcon, built by Brush at Loughborough, which had twin  Maybach engines. After trials, British Railways preferred the BRCW approach, but ordered them to be built by Brush Traction, and they became British Rail Class 47.

Preserved BRCW Locomotive + Units

References

 
Defunct companies based in Birmingham, West Midlands
Manufacturing companies based in Birmingham, West Midlands
Companies based in Smethwick
Rail transport in the West Midlands (county)
British companies established in 1854
Manufacturing companies established in 1854
1854 establishments in England
British companies disestablished in 1963
Manufacturing companies disestablished in 1963
1963 disestablishments in England